Ampika Pickston is an English model, reality TV star and business owner. She is best known for starring in The Real Housewives of Cheshire from 2015 to 2017. Pickston is the CEO of Ampika's Aesthetics, a training school based in Hale, Greater Manchester, which teaches Aesthetics procedures.

Early life 

Pickston was born in Oldham, Lancashire, and grew up in Shaw, Lancashire, where she was raised by her grandfather, William Fawcet. Her father, Paul, worked for British Telecom during her early years. Pickston attended Rishworth School. Her mother is Thai.

The Real Housewives of Cheshire 
In January 2015, the British reality TV series The Real Housewives of Cheshire debuted, with Ampika Pickston as one of the original cast members, along with Leanne Brown, Magali Gorré, Tanya Bardsley, Lauren Simon and Dawn Ward. A British adaptation of the long-running American series The Real Housewives of Orange County, the series follows the lives of a selection of wealthy women in Cheshire. Pickston left the show at the end of season 5 (2017) after appearing in 55 episodes and three reunions.

Pickston won the Best Female Personality Award at the Sixth Annual National Reality TV Awards.

Other television appearances 
Pickston has appeared on Celebrity Ghost Hunt Live, broadcast on Channel 5 in 2017 alongside former Love Island contestant Chris Hughes. She also took part in a cooking mini series for ITVBe, and an episode of Rich House Poor House for Channel 5.

Business career

Ampika's Aesthetics 
Pickston is the CEO of Ampika's Aesthetics, a cosmetic training business with schools in Hale, Edinburgh, Bristol, Newcastle and London's Harley Street. It was founded in 2019.

The training academy offers aesthetic and cosmetic training for beginners and medical professionals to gain experience and CPD accreditation. It is regulated by OFQUAL through Qualifi. All of the courses are led and taught by medical professionals.

AP Care Homes 
Pickston is the Director of AP Care Homes, a company based in the North West of England which provides residential care for children. The home caters for the needs of children aged 12-16 with emotional and behavioural difficulties. It employs a registered manager, deputy manager and seven full time key workers. It is a long term solution for vulnerable children.

Skinny Revolution 
Pickston founded Skinny Revolution to help people to lose weight after she gained 7 stone in 14 months whilst pregnant, using a Wegovy (semaglutide) injection, which is a 2.4 mg injectable prescription medicine used as an appetite suppressant.

Personal life 
Pickston is currently engaged to West Ham United co-chairman David Sullivan.

She has a son, Jake, with her former husband Mark Pickston.

She currently lives in Hale Barns, in the house which was filmed for the Real Housewives of Cheshire episodes that she appeared in.

References 

Year of birth missing (living people)
Living people